Randy S. Rinks, also known as Randy "Bear" Rinks (born January 1, 1954) is an American businessman (formerly a dealer in building materials, now a real estate agent) and politician from Savannah, Tennessee who served nine terms in the Tennessee House of Representatives, from 1991-2009 (97th through 105th General Assemblies), after serving as mayor of Savannah for four years (1987-1990). A Democrat, he succeeded Republican Herman L. Wolfe Sr. in the House. Rinks was born in Houston, Texas and went to University of Tennessee at Martin.

He did not run for re-election in 2008, and was succeeded by Republican Vance Dennis.

References

1954 births
Living people
People from Savannah, Tennessee
People from Houston
University of Tennessee at Martin alumni
Mayors of places in Tennessee
Democratic Party members of the Tennessee House of Representatives
American construction businesspeople
American real estate brokers
Businesspeople from Tennessee